This is a list of Louisiana Ragin' Cajuns football players in the NFL Draft.

Key

Selections

References

Louisiana

Louisiana Ragin' Cajuns NFL Draft